The Fiftieth Wisconsin Legislature convened from  to  in regular session, and re-convened in a special session from , to . During this term, legislative business was largely held in the north wing of the Wisconsin State Capitol, which was the only part of the capitol to remain intact after the 1904 fire.

This session was notable for the implementation of Wisconsin's first income tax—the first income tax in the United States.

This session was also the high water mark for the Social Democratic Party in Wisconsin, representing 12 of Milwaukee County's 16 districts in the Assembly, and 2 of Milwaukee County's 5 Senate districts.

Senators representing odd-numbered districts were newly elected for this session and were serving the first two years of a four-year term. Assembly members were elected to a two-year term. Assembly members and odd-numbered senators were elected in the general election of November 8, 1910. Senators representing even-numbered districts were serving the third and fourth year of a four-year term, having been elected in the general election of November 3, 1908.

Major events
 January 2, 1911: Inauguration of Francis E. McGovern as the 22nd Governor of Wisconsin.
 January 21, 1911: The National Progressive Republican League was founded in the home of Wisconsin's senior United States senator Robert M. La Follette, unofficially launching his campaign for the Republican nomination for President of the United States.
 January 24, 1911: Robert M. La Follette was re-elected as United States Senator by the Wisconsin Legislature in joint session.
 January 26, 1911: The United States and Canada announced their first reciprocal trade agreement.
 March 25, 1911: The Triangle Shirtwaist Factory fire occurred in New York City, resulting in 146 deaths.
 May 15, 1911: The United States Supreme Court published their decision in Standard Oil Co. of New Jersey v. United States, finding that Standard Oil was in violation of the Sherman Antitrust Act and would therefore be dissolved into 34 new companies.
 September 12, 1911: Wisconsin Governor Francis E. McGovern became chairman of the National Governors Association.
 September 29, 1911: The Kingdom of Italy declared war on the Ottoman Empire to claim territory in north Africa.
 November 4, 1911: The Morocco–Congo Treaty was agreed between the German Empire, the French Republic, and the Kingdom of Spain, redrawing significant parts of the map of Africa.
 January 1, 1912: The Republic of China was established.
 January 23, 1912: The first International Opium Convention was agreed at The Hague, signed by the German Empire, the United States, the Republic of China, the French Republic, the United Kingdom, the Kingdom of Italy, the Empire of Japan, the Kingdom of the Netherlands, the State of Persia, the Portuguese Republic, the Russian Empire, and the Kingdom of Siam. 
 April 14, 1912: The RMS Titanic struck an iceberg in the north Atlantic and sunk, resulting in more than 1,500 deaths.  
 June 6, 1912: The Novarupta volcano in the Alaska Territory experienced a VEI 6 eruption—the most powerful volcanic eruption of the 20th century.
 June 20, 1912: At the 1912 Republican National Convention, Progressive supporters of Theodore Roosevelt and Robert M. La Follette bolted the party after two days of acrimony over disputed delegate slates.
 August 4, 1912: U.S. marines landed in Nicaragua at the request of the Nicaraguan Conservative Party government, beginning a 20-year occupation of Nicaragua.
 October 8, 1912: The Kingdom of Montenegro declared war against the Ottoman Empire, initiating the First Balkan War.
 October 14, 1912: John Flammang Schrank shot presidential candidate and former U.S. President Theodore Roosevelt during a campaign event in Milwaukee.  Roosevelt survived, but the bullet remained in his chest for the rest of his life.
 November 5, 1912: 1912 United States general election:
 Woodrow Wilson elected President of the United States
 Francis E. McGovern re-elected as Governor of Wisconsin
 Wisconsin voters approved an amendment to the state constitution to allow the Legislature to set judges' salaries and payment schedule.
 Wisconsin voters approved an amendment to the state constitution to allow cities and counties to exceed their debt caps to purchase land for public improvements.
 Wisconsin voters approved an amendment to the state constitution to allow municipalities to purchase land for public improvements.

Major legislation
 March 2, 1911: An Act to provide for the nomination of judicial officers in the counties having a population of over one hundred thousand inhabitants by a non-partisan primary election, 1911 Act 4. 
 April 29, 1911: An Act to create sections 1408a to 1408d, inclusive, of the statutes, relating to the prevention and control of dangerous communicable diseases, 1911 Act 44. Gave additional powers and responsibilities to state and local public health officials.
 June 5, 1911: An Act to amend section 12 of the statutes, extending the right of suffrage to women, 1911 Act 227. 
 July 13, 1911: An Act ... relating to taxation of incomes, and making an appropriation therefor, 1911 Act 658.  Created Wisconsin's first income tax—the first income tax in the United States.
 July 15, 1911: An Act to repeal sections 9, 10 and 11 of the statutes, and to create three new sections to be designated sections 9, 10 and 11 of the statutes, relating to re-apportionment of the state into senate, assembly and congressional districts, 1911 Act 661. 
 Joint Resolution to amend section 10, article VII, of the constitution, relating to the salary of judges, 1911 Joint Resolution 24.  Second legislative passage of the proposed amendment to the state constitution to give the Legislature the power to set judicial salaries and pay schedules.  This amendment was ratified by voters in the 1912 Fall election.
 Joint Amendment ratifying the sixteenth amendment to the constitution of the United States, 1911 Joint Resolution 25. 
 Joint Resolution memorializing Congress to take proper steps for the adoption of an amendment to the federal Constitution providing that such Constitution may hereafter be amended by the initiative, 1911 Joint Resolution 29.  Called for a federal constitutional amendment to allow future amendments to be initiated by citizen petition.
 Joint Resolution memorializing Congress to take proper steps toward a Constitutional amendment providing for initiative, referendum, and recall, 1911 Joint Resolution 30.  Called for a federal constitutional amendment to allow legislation to be initiated by petition, and for federal officials to be recalled by petition.
 Joint Resolution to amend article XI of the constitution, by adding thereto a new section to be known as section 3b, relating to the acquisition of land by municipalities, 1911 Joint Resolution 37.  Proposed an amendment to the state constitution to expand powers of municipalities to purchase land, and delegating to the Legislature the power to set parameters around these powers.
 Joint Resolution to amend Article XIII of the Constitution providing for the recall of public officers, 1911 Joint Resolution 41.  Proposed a constitutional amendment to allow citizen petitions for recall of state elected officials.
 Joint Resolution to amend section 3 of article XI of the Constitution, relating to municipal corporations and their indebtedness, 1911 Joint Resolution 42. Second legislative passage of the proposed amendment to the state constitution to allow municipalities to exceed debt limits for the purpose of buying land for public improvements.  This amendment was ratified by voters in the 1912 Fall election.
 Joint Resolution to amend section 10 of article VIII of the constitution, relating to internal improvements, 1911 Joint Resolution 47.  This was a second attempt at to propose an amendment to the state constitution to authorize state funding for certain public improvements after the previous amendment was rejected by voters in 1910.  This amendment was ratified by voters in the 1912 Fall election.
 Joint Resolution to amend article XI of the constitution by adding thereto a new section to be known as section 3a, relating to the acquisition of lands by the state or pay of its cities for certain public purposes, 1911 Joint Resolution 48. Second legislative passage of a proposed amendment to the state constitution to allow municipalities to purchase land for public improvements.  This amendment was ratified by voters in the 1912 Fall election.
 Joint Resolution to add section 13, to article VIII, of the constitution, relating to state insurance, 1911 Joint Resolution 56.  Proposed an amendment to the state constitution to enable the state to grant insurance by methods to be prescribed in legislation.
 Joint Resolution to create seetion 11 of article VIII of the Constitution, relating to state insurance, 1911 Joint Resolution 65.  Proposed an amendment to the state constitution to enable the state to set up insurance and annuities by methods prescribed in legislation.
 Joint Resolution to amend section 21, of article IV, of the constitution, relating to compensation of members of the legislature, 1911 Joint Resolution 66.  This was another attempt to raise the compensation of state legislators after the previous attempt was rejected by voters in 1910.
 Joint Resolution to amend sections 6 and 7, of article VII, of the constitution of the state of Wisconsin, relating to circuit judges, 1911 Joint Resolution 67.  Proposed an amendment to the state constitution to grant the Legislature the option to decrease the number of circuits in the Wisconsin circuit court system.
 Joint Resolution to amend section 1, article XII of the constitution, providing for the submission of amendments to the constitution by the legislature upon a three-fifths vote of the members elected, 1911 Joint Resolution 71. Proposed an amendment to the state constitution to allow a fast track for future amendments if they clear a 60% threshold in the Legislature.
 Joint Resolution to amend section 1, of article IV of the constitution, to give to the people the power to propose laws and to enact or reject the same at the polls, and to approve or reject at the polls any act of the legislature; and to create section 3, of article XII of the constitution, providing for the submission of amendments to the constitution upon the petition of the people, 1911 Joint Resolution 74.  Proposed an amendment to the state constitution to allow citizens to propose or reject legislation by petition and referendum.
 May 6, 1912: An Act to create sections 35–20 to 35–24, inclusive, of the statutes, providing for nonpartisan nominations and elections in cities, 1912 Special Session Act 11. Extended the nonpartisan primary system to local offices.
 May 6, 1912: An Act to amend sections 94–20, 94–21 and 94–22 of the statutes, relating to elections, 1912 Special Session Act 11.  Establishing filing deadlines for candidates seeking office respecting new primary schedules.

Party summary

Senate summary

Assembly summary

Sessions
 1st Regular session: January 11, 1911July 15, 1911
 April 1912 Special session: April 30, 1912May 6, 1912

Leaders

Senate leadership
 President of the Senate: Thomas Morris (R)
 President pro tempore: Harry C. Martin (R–Darlington)

Assembly leadership
 Speaker of the Assembly: C. A. Ingram (R–Durand)

Members

Members of the Senate
Members of the Senate for the Fiftieth Wisconsin Legislature:

Members of the Assembly
Members of the Assembly for the Fiftieth Wisconsin Legislature:

Committees

Senate committees
 Senate Standing Committee on CorporationsW. C. Owen, chair
 Senate Standing Committee on Education and Public WelfareJ. S. Donald, chair
 Senate Standing Committee on FinanceA. W. Sanborn, chair
 Senate Standing Committee on the JudiciaryJ. J. Blaine, chair
 Senate Standing Committee on Legislative ProcedureH. C. Martin, chair
 Senate Standing Committee on State AffairsH. Krumrey, chair
 Senate Special Committee on BankingW. C. Owen, chair
 Senate Special Committee on EducationJ. S. Donald, chair
 Senate Special Committee on Good RoadsJ. S. Donald, chair
 Senate Special Committee on Income TaxJ. C. Kleczka, chair
 Senate Special Committee on Industrial InsuranceA. W. Sanborn, chair
 Senate Special Committee on Memorial Park at Camp RandallD. G. James, chair
 Senate Special Committee on Water Power, Forestry, and DrainageP. O. Husting, chair

Assembly committees
 Assembly Standing Committee on AgricultureA. Johnson, chair
 Assembly Standing Committee on Agricultural ExhibitionsM. O'Connor, chair
 Assembly Standing Committee on BanksO. A. Crowell, chair
 Assembly Standing Committee on the CapitolC. J. Johnson, chair
 Assembly Standing Committee on Charitable and Penal InstitutionsC. B. Ballard, chair
 Assembly Standing Committee on CitiesE. C. Stern, chair
 Assembly Standing Committee on City Living ConditionsC. A. Harper, chair
 Assembly Standing Committee on Commerce and ManufacturesD. B. Stevens, chair
 Assembly Standing Committee on ConservationJ. H. Kamper, chair
 Assembly Standing Committee on Constitutional AmendmentL. E. Gettle, chair
 Assembly Standing Committee on County Living ConditionsT. J. Mahon, chair
 Assembly Standing Committee on CountiesW. Reader, chair
 Assembly Standing Committee on Courts and ProcedureH. J. Mortensen, chair
 Assembly Standing Committee on EducationC. F. Viebahn, chair
 Assembly Standing Committee on ElectionsT. A. Roycraft, chair
 Assembly Standing Committee on Engrossed BillsR. Reed, chair
 Assembly Standing Committee on Enrolled BillsW. E. Hurlbut, chair
 Assembly Standing Committee on Excise and FeesM. Hull, chair
 Assembly Standing Committee on Express, Telegraph, and TelephoneO. Onstad, chair
 Assembly Standing Committee on Fish and GameE. L. Urquhart, chair
 Assembly Standing Committee on HighwaysJ. R. Jones, chair
 Assembly Standing Committee on InsuranceL. L. Johnson, chair
 Assembly Standing Committee on the JudiciaryE. McConnell, chair
 Assembly Standing Committee on Labor and Labor ConditionsW. H. Bell, chair
 Assembly Standing Committee on Legislative ProcedureC. A. Ingram, chair
 Assembly Standing Committee on LibrariesJ. C. Gilbertson, chair
 Assembly Standing Committee on Military AffairsS. Smith, chair
 Assembly Standing Committee on National and Interstate RelationsO. L. Olen, chair
 Assembly Standing Committee on Parks, Play Grounds, and City PlanningG. W. Bingham, chair
 Assembly Standing Committee on PrintingD. Schreiner, chair
 Assembly Standing Committee on Public Health and SanitationL. E. Youmans, chair
 Assembly Standing Committee on Purity of CommoditiesG. U. Fisher, chair
 Assembly Standing Committee on State and Economic BettermentW. A. Kay, chair
 Assembly Standing Committee on TaxationE. E. Haight, chair
 Assembly Standing Committee on Third ReadingT. Frye, chair
 Assembly Standing Committee on Towns and VillagesP. H. Jones, chair
 Assembly Standing Committee on TransportationA. V. Wells, chair
 Assembly Standing Committee on Vocational EducationC. H. Dorner, chair
 Assembly Standing Committee on Welfare of Women and ChildrenS. C. Goff, chair
 Assembly Standing Committee on Workmen's CompensationR. L. Clark, chair

Joint committees
 Joint Committee on FinanceR. J. Nye (Asm.)
 Joint Committee on RevisionO. H. Berg (Asm.)

Employees

Senate employees
 Chief Clerk: Fred M. Wylie
 Journal Clerk: J. L. Schnitzler
 Assistant Journal Clerk: John Meili
 Bookkeeper: John M. Bessey
 Assistant Bookkeeper: H. E. Blackman
 Engrossing Clerk: A. C. Tretow
 Assistant Engrossing Clerks:
 G. D. Theleen
 R. E. Gordon
 Enrolling Clerk: Elmer Trickey
 Assistant Enrolling Clerks:
 C. E. Mullen
 J. E. Schunck
 Index Clerk: C. W. Rhodes
 Clerk of the Committee on Corporations: A. J. Nelson
 Clerk of the Committee on Education and Public Welfare: R. H. Hillyer
 Clerk of the Committee on Finance: Albert W. Orr
 Clerk of the Committee on the Judiciary: F. W. Spencer
 Clerk of the Committee on State Affairs: March Polk
 Sergeant-at-Arms: Charles A. Leicht
 Assistant Sergeant-at-Arms: William A. Powell
 Document Clerk: Elmer A. Pierce
 Day Police: E. P. Mahoney
 Night Police: William Mackmiller
 Laborer: A. R. Oates
 Postmaster: D. E. Williams

Assembly employees
 Chief Clerk: C. E. Shaffer
 Journal Clerk: W. W. Jones
 Assistant Journal Clerk: C. E. Tuffley
 Bookkeeper: W. J. Goldschmidt
 Assistant Bookkeeper: J. C. Hawker
 General Clerks: 
 L. M. Shearer
 E. V. Nevins
 Index Clerk: A. H. Heidner
 Proofreaders and Enrolling Clerks:
 R. E. Van Matre
 Jos. H. Blied
 Engrossing Clerk: L. B. Webster
 Sergeant-at-Arms: William S. Irvine
 Assistant Sergeant-at-Arms: Olaf Goldstrand
 Document Room Custodian: J. W. Bathgate
 Assistant Document Room Custodian: J. J. Ruble
 Police:
 E. F. Wright
 L. Longbotham
 O. O. Owen
 Cloak Room Attendant: Martin Olson 
 Laborer: A. Mieskothe
 Night Watch: E. C. Cady
 Postmaster: W. A. Mayhew
 Post Office Messenger: J. Hembre

Notes

References

External links
 1911: Related Documents from Wisconsin Legislature

1911 in Wisconsin
1912 in Wisconsin
Wisconsin
Wisconsin
Wisconsin legislative sessions